Dhruba KC was the coach of the Nepal national football team, appointed on July 16, 2015 after foreign coach Jack Stefanowski did not have his contract renewed.

Career
Dhruba KC started off by coaching Nepal national football team in the All India Governor's Gold Cup in Sikkim, India. However, as the tournament is not an official international tournament it wasn't regonized by FIFA as actually having coached the national team. Dhruba KC also coached the Three Star Club in 2005 where his team reached the semi-finals of the 2005 AFC President's Cup only to lose on penalties. He also coached the Nepali women's national team in the inaugural 2010 SAFF Women's Championship and subsequent 2012 SAFF Women's Championship where both times Nepal finished runners up to India. Dhruba KC also spent a brief time as head coach of Machhindra in 2010.

References

Living people
Nepalese football managers
Nepal national football team managers
Year of birth missing (living people)